Meaux Cathedral is a Roman Catholic church in the town of Meaux, France. It is located in the department of Seine-et-Marne, east of Paris. The cathedral is a national monument, and is the seat of the Bishop of Meaux.

History
Construction of the cathedral began about 1170, when a structure in Romanesque style was started, on the site of a previous Church of Saint Stephen. Around 1269, a complete reconstruction was undertaken by Bishop Jean de Poincy. Defects in the original design and construction had to be corrected in the 13th century, in which the architect Gautier de Vainfroy was much involved. He had to remove the previous cathedral almost totally and start a new structure in Gothic style. It's chief patroness was Queen Joan I of Navarre. 

In the later 13th century work was often interrupted due to lack of funds, a problem removed by the generosity of Charles IV in the early 14th century.  Further progress was interrupted by the Hundred Years' War and occupation by the English. Unfortunately, soft stone was used and parts of the exterior have eroded.

Carvings throughout the church were mutilated by the Huguenots in 1562, and from that date no further work was done on the building. One tower remains stunted. A tall spire over the transept fell into ruin and was removed in 1610.
The archives of the diocese were destroyed in 1793 – 1794, thus deleting much knowledge about the early history of the church.

The composer Pierre Moulu worked at the cathedral in the early 16th century.

Because of its construction period, the design of the cathedral encompasses several periods of Gothic architecture. The cathedral rises to a height of 48 meters; inside, the vaults at the choir rise to 33 meters. The interior ornamentation is noted for its smoothness, and the space for its overall luminosity. The cathedral contains a famous organ, built in the 17th century.

In September 1916, on the second anniversary of the First Battle of the Marne a service of thanksgiving was held. celebrating the French victory.

Burials
Jacques-Bénigne Bossuet
Bishop Louis Pierre Joseph Cornet (31 October 1923 - 11 September 2006)
Marie of France, Countess of Champagne
Saint Fiacre

See also
List of Gothic Cathedrals in Europe

References

Sources
 Dictionnaire des églises de France, Belgique, Luxembourg, Suisse (Tome IV-D). pp. 104–106. Robert Laffont: Paris.
 Esquieu, Yves, 1994: Quartier cathédral. Rempart / Desclée de Brouwer: Paris. 

Roman Catholic cathedrals in France
Churches in Seine-et-Marne
Basilica churches in France